Iberoevania is an extinct genus of evaniid which existed in what is now Spain during the early Cretaceous period. It was named by Enrique Peñalver, Jaime Ortega-Blanco, André Nel and Xavier Delclòs in 2010, and the type species is Iberoevania roblesi.

References

Evanioidea
Prehistoric Hymenoptera genera
Fossil taxa described in 2010